The AN/SQQ-89 Undersea Warfare Combat System is a naval anti-submarine warfare (ASW) system for surface warships developed by Lockheed Martin for the United States Navy.  The system presents an integrated picture of the tactical situation by receiving, combining and processing active and passive sensor data from the hull-mounted array, towed array and sonobuoys. AN/SQQ-89 is integrated with the AEGIS combat system and provides a full range of undersea warfare (USW) functions including active and passive sensors, underwater fire control, onboard trainer and a highly evolved display subsystem. It provides detection, classification, and targeting capability to the following platforms:

References

External links
 Official US Navy Fact File AN/SQQ-89 
 AN-SQQ-89 ASW Combat System

Military electronics of the United States
Military sonar equipment of the United States